Ilmari Saarelainen (born 12 September 1944 in Uusikaupunki) is a Finnish actor. His career has been mainly based on television.

Saarelainen began acting in 1970 appearing in a number of TV series. His career has mainly been based on Finnish television although in the early to mid-1980s he starred in a number of Finnish films most famously as the bumbling lead character in the 1983 James Bond spoof Agent 000 and the Deadly Curves.

See also 
 Tankki täyteen

External links 

1944 births
Living people
People from Uusikaupunki
Finnish male film actors
Finnish male television actors
20th-century Finnish male actors